Moqhaka is a municipality in the Fezile Dabi District, Free State Province, South Africa. In 2001 the population was 267 881 with a total area of 7925 km ². The seat of local government is Kroonstad. The community name is the South-Sotho-word for "crown".

Main places
The 2001 census divided the municipality into the following main places:

Politics 

The municipal council consists of forty-four members elected by mixed-member proportional representation. Twenty-two councillors are elected by first-past-the-post voting in twenty-two wards, while the remaining twenty-two are chosen from party lists so that the total number of party representatives is proportional to the number of votes received. In the 2021 South African municipal elections the African National Congress (ANC) won a majority of twenty-two seats on the council.

The following table shows the results of the 2021 election.

References

External links
 Moqhaka Local Municipality

Local municipalities of the Fezile Dabi District Municipality